The 2018 Malaysia FA Cup (also known as Shopee Malaysia FA Cup for sponsorship reasons) was the 29th season of the Malaysia FA Cup, a knockout competition for Malaysia's state football association and clubs. 

40 teams entered the competition.

Qualified teams
The following teams are qualified for the competition. Reserve teams are excluded.

Round and draw dates

Matches 
Key: (1) = Super League; (2) = Premier League; (3) = FAM League; (4) = Liga Sosial

First Round

Second Round

Third Round

Bracket

Quarter-final 
|-

|}

First leg

Second leg

Semi-final 
|-

|}

First leg

Second leg

Final 

The final was played on 7 July 2018 at Bukit Jalil National Stadium.

Top goalscorers

See also 
 2018 Malaysia Super League
 2018 Malaysia Premier League
 2018 Malaysia FAM Cup
 2018 Malaysia Cup
 2018 Piala Presiden
 2018 Piala Belia
 List of Malaysian football transfers 2018

References

External links
 Football Malaysia LLP website - Piala FA
 Result Reports 

Piala FA seasons
2018 domestic association football cups
FA